Un Estilo (English A style) is the 1st studio album by Mexican pop singer Ana Gabriel. It was released on 1985. She participated with the song Búscame (Look for me) in the OTI Festival which media started to know about her. In the beginning she found it difficult, as no label was willing to give her the opportunity, til the then-label CBS Records, now Columbia Records, signed her. The sales of the album were low, though it was received well. The album also features a cover of the Eurythmics song "Right By Your Side" entitled Sin ti no sé amar.

Track listing
Tracks:
 Búscame
 ¿Que nos pasó?
 Sin ti no se amar
 Lo quiero todo
 ¿Quién te crees que soy?
 Amor sin memoria
 Pienso en ti
 Déjame vivir
 No me lastimes más
 Promesas
 Que sea por amor

References

1985 albums
Ana Gabriel albums